Olga M. Nazarova (born 28 February 1962) is a Russian former athlete who competed mainly in the 400 metres hurdles. She achieved her best time in the 400 m hurdles with 54.82 secs at the Athletissima on 6 July 1994, and won the 400 m hurdles title at the 1995 Russian Athletics Championships.

International competitions

References

1962 births
Living people
Place of birth missing (living people)
Russian female hurdlers
Competitors at the 1994 Goodwill Games
World Athletics Championships athletes for Russia
Russian Athletics Championships winners